Woodrum Lake Wildlife Management Area, is located about  east of Romance, West Virginia in Jackson County.

Built in 1988 by the U.S. Soil Conservation Service to protect Middle Fork Creek, the 240 acre lake was drained in order to repair the dam and correct a lock mechanism jammed by a sunken log in 2005. Repaired, refilled and restocked, it is now again popular with bass and muskellunge as well as panfish (bluegill, crappie and catfish) anglers. Trout are not stocked. Trolling boats are permitted, with a maximum of 10 horsepower.

Deer, waterfowl and small game can also be hunted, with permit and seasonal restriction. Camping is not permitted.

Access to Woodrum Lake WMA is by County Route 42 (Romance-Advent Road) from Romance, or by County Route 19 from Kentuck.

Hunting and Fishing

Hunting opportunities in the WMA include deer, grouse, rabbit, squirrel, turkey, and waterfowl.

Fishing opportunities in the  Woodrum Lake include largemouth and spotted bass, bluegill, crappie, muskellunge.

Camping is not available at the WMA.

See also

Animal conservation
Hunting
List of West Virginia wildlife management areas

References

External links
West Virginia DNR District 6 Wildlife Management Areas
West Virginia Hunting Regulations
West Virginia Fishing Regulations

Wildlife management areas of West Virginia
Protected areas of Jackson County, West Virginia
IUCN Category V